The Djebel Babor Nature Reserve is a protected area in Algeria. The reserve is within the Babor Mountains. Much of this area is forested with Mediterranean conifer and mixed forests. This reserve offers one of the few remaining disjunctive habitats for the endangered Barbary macaque, Macaca sylvanus, a primate species which prehistorically held a much wider range. The reserve is also a significant birdwatching area.

See also
 Atlas Mountains

References
 C. Michael Hogan (2008) Barbary Macaque: Macaca sylvanus, Globaltwitcher.com, ed. N. Strõmberg

Line notes

Protected areas of Algeria